Mario Scaramella (born 23 April 1970) is a lawyer, security consultant and academic nuclear expert.  He came to international prominence in 2006 in connection with the poisoning of the ex-FSB agent Alexander Litvinenko. As responsible for intelligence analysis and production on KGB and military GRU espionage in Europe, he served as an investigator and adviser to the Mitrokhin Commission.
Scaramella was a suspect by the Italian justice department for calumny.

While working for the Intelligence and Mitrokhin Dossier Investigative Commission at the Italian Parliament, Scaramella claimed a Ukrainian ex-KGB officer living in Naples, Alexander Talik, conspired with three other Ukrainians officers to assassinate Senator Guzzanti. The Ukrainians were arrested and special weapons including grenades were confiscated, but Talik claimed that Scaramella had used intelligence to overestimate the story of the assassination attempt, which brought the calumny charge on him. Talik also claimed that rocket propelled grenades sent to him in Italy had in fact been sent by Scaramella himself as an undercover agent.

Career

Academic background 
Between 1996 and 2000, he served as a full professor of international and environmental law at the Externado University and the University of Nuestra Señora del Rosario in Bogotá, Colombia where he served also as advisor to the Head of National Police Gen. Rosso Serrano Cadena. He also held a post as Academic Director at environmental crime institute at the University of Naples and Full Professor of public law.
Until 2006, Scaramella was best known for a memo claiming that a Soviet submarine left nuclear mines in the Bay of Naples in 1970. IAEA and IMO official reports confirmed Scaramella statement. He claimed that his team of experts had long been involved in investigating the smuggling of radioactive material by the KGB and its successors.

The Environmental Crime Prevention Program 

Between 2000 and 2002, he was appointed by the Assistant Administrator of United States Environmental Protection Agency Steven Hermann as secretary general of the organization Environmental Crime Prevention Program (ECPP), then signed on 12 October 2000, a Memorandum of Understanding for cooperation with the Secretariat of the Basel Convention on the Environment, which is part of the United Nations Environment Programme. One of his few public appearances was in 2002 at a security related conference, among with the CIA Deputy Director for Analysis and Production Mr. Gannon, for  giving a lecture on "space anti-terror technologies". ECPP's observership's status to the United Nations London Convention/Protocol meetings was withdrawn in July 2007.

Poisoning

On 1 November 2006, Scaramella met the Russian former FSB agent and defector Alexander Litvinenko for lunch at Itsu, a sushi restaurant in Piccadilly, London. Scaramella has stated he ate nothing and drank only water at the restaurant. On 1 December 2006, he was taken to University College Hospital, and it was confirmed that he had been exposed to Polonium-210, the substance which was thought to have been eaten by Alexander Litvinenko at the aforementioned lunch, and which killed him. Although Scaramella initially denied having the substance in his body, his lawyer made a statement on the same day saying that they would make no comment until the results of the tests were finalised. A room at Ashdown Park Hotel, in Sussex, where Scaramella is thought to have stayed whilst in the U.K. has been sealed off due to possible contamination.

Some news outlets have speculated that Scaramella may have been Litvinenko's assassin.

On 3 December, Italian Senator Paolo Guzzanti was quoted after speaking with Scaramella by phone, saying health officials had told Scaramella the dose of polonium he had received is usually fatal. Guzzanti told Reuters:
"They also said so far, nobody could ever survive this poison, so it is very unlikely he could. But, if he doesn't collapse in three months, there is a kind of hope ... They said that every six months ... the radioactivity decreases by half".
Latest news inform that he was only exposed to minute traces of polonium.

Litvinenko's brother Maxim, who lives in Italy, told that Scaramella wanted to use his brother as a source for his research into Italian politicians and their alleged links to the Russian intelligence services. According to Maxim, one of the things Alexander Litvinenko did for Scaramella was sit down in front of a video camera in early 2006 in Rome. Litvinenko said that the video should not be leaked to the press. However, he went on saying, in front of camera, that former FSB deputy chief Anatoly Trofimov warned him in 2000 that he should not move to Italy because Romano Prodi was "one of their men". Maxim said he was paid €200 in cash to translate on the day Scaramella recorded the video. Scaramella paid Alexander Litvinenko €500-600 to cover travel expenses.

The Mitrokhin Commission 

On 24 December 2006, Scaramella returned to Italy where he was immediately arrested by DIGOS, a division of the Italian national police. He is charged with calumny. According to prosecutor Pietro Salvitti, cited by La Repubblica and who has indicted Scaramella, Nicolò Pollari, head of SISMI indicted in the Imam Rapito affair, as well as SISMI n°2, Marco Mancini, arrested in July 2006 for the same reason, were some of the informers, alongside Mario Scaramella, of senator Paolo Guzzanti. Beside targeting Romano Prodi and his staff, this "network", according to Pietro Salvitti's words, also aimed at defaming General Giuseppe Cucchi (current director of the CESIS), Milan's judges Armando Spataro, in charge of the Imam Rapito case, and Guido Salvini, as well as La Repubblica reporters Carlo Bonini and Giuseppe D'Avanzo.

References

External links 
 The Secret Life of Mario Scaramella - Slate Magazine, 11 December 2006
 The Times - Poison plotters claim their second victim 2 December 2006
 Sushi bar man is nuclear waste expert Evening Standard, 25 November 2006
 Soviet Navy left 20 nuclear warheads in bay of Naples' - The Independent, 19 March 2005
 The Litvinenko murder: Scaramella - The Italian Connection - The Independent, 3 December 2006
 Environmental Crime Prevention Programme - home page
 Statute of the Environmental Crime Prevention Programme - by Mario Scaramella
 'Meeting Scaramella' by Rome based journalist-writer Philip Willan

1970 births
Living people
Jurists from Naples
20th-century Italian lawyers
Prisoners and detainees of Italy